The Gratiot River is a  river on the north side of the Keweenaw Peninsula in Michigan. It is a tributary of Lake Superior.

See also
List of rivers of Michigan

References

Michigan  Streamflow Data from the USGS

Rivers of Michigan
Tributaries of Lake Superior